Nooh Al-Mousa (born 23 February 1991) is a Saudi football player who plays as a defensive midfielder for Al-Fateh and the Saudi Arabia national team.

Career
Nooh Al-Mousa started his career with Al-Fateh where he progressed through the youth ranks. He made his debut for the first team during the 2012–13 season in the match against Al-Raed. He won the league with Al-Fateh during his first season as a first-team player. Al-Mousa became a regular starter for Al-Fateh during the 2016–17 season where he played 29 matches throughout all competitions. In 2018, as part of a deal between the Saudi Arabian Football Federation and La Liga, Al-Mousa joined Spanish club Real Valladolid on a six-month loan. On April 27, 2018, Al-Mousa signed a 4-year contract with Al-Ahli. On 6 March 2022, Al-Mousa signed a pre-contract with former club Al-Fateh. He joined the club following the expiration of his contract with Al-Ahli.

International career
He made his debut against Latvia in a non-friendly game on 7 November 2017. He officially started his journey against Portugal national football team on 10 November 2017. He was called up for the 23rd Arabian Gulf Cup and started all 3 matches as the Falcons exited the competition at the group stage. Al-Mousa was called up for the 2019 AFC Asian Cup and appeared in one match, the final group stage match against Qatar.

Career statistics

Club

International
Statistics accurate as of match played 17 January 2019.

Honours
Al-Fateh
Saudi Professional League: 2012–13
Saudi Super Cup: 2013

Valladolid
Segunda División: 2017–18

References

External links 
 

1991 births
Living people
People from Al-Hasa
Saudi Arabian footballers
Association football midfielders
Saudi Professional League players
Al-Fateh SC players
Real Valladolid players
Al-Ahli Saudi FC players
Saudi Arabian expatriate footballers
Saudi Arabian expatriate sportspeople in Spain
Expatriate footballers in Spain
2019 AFC Asian Cup players
Saudi Arabia international footballers
Saudi Arabian Shia Muslims